Right Side PAC was a super PAC created by a group of Republicans with a mission of convincing anti-Donald Trump Republican voters to vote for Democratic presidential nominee Joe Biden in the 2020 United States presidential election. It was a single-candidate PAC, with Biden being the only supported candidate.

The group targeted voters in swing states such as Arizona, Florida, Michigan, North Carolina, Pennsylvania, and Wisconsin.

The group was led by Matt Borges, a former chairman of the Ohio Republican Party. Former White House Communications Director Anthony Scaramucci who served under Trump, is also a member of the PAC. The super PAC shut down in July 2020 – a month after being formed – after Borges was arrested on federal corruption charges.

See also
 43 Alumni for Biden
 Never Trump movement
 The Lincoln Project
 List of former Trump administration officials who endorsed Joe Biden
 List of Republicans who opposed the 2016 Donald Trump presidential campaign
 List of Republicans who oppose the 2020 Donald Trump presidential campaign
 List of Trump administration appointees who endorsed Joe Biden
 REPAIR
 Republican Voters Against Trump

References

External links 
 
 

United States political action committees
2020 establishments in the United States
2020 disestablishments in the United States